Runyon v. McCrary, 427 U.S. 160 (1976), was a case heard before the United States Supreme Court, which held that federal law prohibited private schools from discriminating on the basis of race.

Background
Two African American students filed suit believing that they were denied admission to private schools in Virginia based on their race. Michael McCrary and Colin Gonzales were denied admission to Bobbe's School; Gonzales was also denied admission to Fairfax-Brewster School. A class action was filed against the schools by the parents of both students. A federal district court ruled for McCrary and Gonzales, finding that the school's admission policies were racially discriminatory. The United States Court of Appeals affirmed the decision.

Russell and Katheryne Runyon d.b.a Bobbe's School and Fairfax-Brewster School were schools in Northern Virginia. Bobbe's was founded in 1958 as a segregation academy with five European-American students.  By 1972 it had grown to 200, but had never admitted a black child. Fairfax-Brewster had a similar history from 1955.

Questions before the Court

 Were the admission policies of the private schools in violation of 42 U.S.C. § 1981?
 Did the Ku Klux Klan Act violate the Constitutional right to privacy and free association?

Decision of the Supreme Court
In a 7–2 decision Justice Stewart wrote the opinion for the Court. The Court determined that the Ku Klux Klan Act prohibited the racially discriminatory policies of the schools. While the schools were private, Jones v. Alfred H. Mayer Co. held that the Ku Klux Klan Act applied to "purely private acts of racial discrimination". Further, Stewart wrote that the school's admission policies were "classical violation[s] of Section 1981". The Court acknowledged that parents had the right to send their children to schools that "promote the belief [of] racial segregation", but that neither parents' nor students' freedom of association was violated by the application of 42 U.S.C. §1981. The Court cited Pierce v. Society of Sisters and the right of the State "reasonably to regulate all schools" to further justify the decision.

Dissenting opinion
Justice White was concerned about the potential far-reaching impact of holding private racial discrimination illegal, which, if taken to its logical conclusion, might ban many varied forms of voluntary self-segregation, including social and advocacy groups that limited their membership to blacks.

Runyon'''s holding was severely limited by Patterson v. McLean Credit Union, which narrowly construed Section 1981 as not applying to any discrimination occurring after the making of a contract, such as racial harassment on the job (although the Patterson majority expressly claimed that they were not overruling Runyon).  In turn, Patterson was legislatively overruled by the Civil Rights Act of 1991.

See also
 List of United States Supreme Court cases, volume 427Jones v. Alfred H. Mayer Co., Brown v. Board of Education'' (similar case, but involved public schools)

References

Further reading

External links
 

United States school desegregation case law
United States Supreme Court cases
United States Supreme Court cases of the Burger Court
1976 in United States case law